Wat’s Pig is a 1996 British stop motion animated short film created by Aardman Animations and written and directed by Peter Lord. 
It is a tale of two princes who are split as babies only to reunite as adults during a war. It is told almost entirely non-verbally.

Plot
In a Medieval castle, a marauder tries to kidnap the twin infant sons of the lord. He makes off with only one, whom he drops about a mile away. A pig rescues this baby, so one brother grows up high on the hog, the other down with the swine. One being lazy, another industrious. Years later, when a neighboring prince declares war, the brother in the castle is too soft to fight. The twins are united just before the final battle.

Production
Wat's Pig was Aardman's sixth Oscar nomination, and Lord's second Oscar nomination as a director.

Peter Lord said: "I don't expect, Wat's Pig to make its money back, or Stage Fright to make its money back, but we have that luxury. We can do that here, because we get money from the commercials and the merchandising malarkey."

He explained some of the production process:

Critical reception
DVD Review describes Wat's Pig as "Scripted, widescreen, more ordinary, and better (than War Story)".

Awards and nominations

|-
| 1997
| Peter Lord
| Academy Award for Best Short Film, Animated
|  
|-
|}

Preservation
Wat's Pig was preserved by the Academy Film Archive in 2013.

References

External links
Wat's Pig (1996) on IMDb
Wat's Pig on  MUBI
Wat's Pig on BCDB

1996 films
1996 animated films
Animated films without speech
1990s animated short films
British short films
Films directed by Peter Lord
Stop-motion animated short films
Aardman Animations short films
1990s English-language films
1990s British films